Atropo was one of three  minelayers built for the  (Royal Italian Navy) during the late 1930s.

Design and description
The Foca-class submarines were improved versions of the preceding Pietro Micca. They displaced  surfaced and  submerged. Their crew numbered 60 officers and enlisted men.

For surface running, the boats were powered by two  diesel engines, each driving one propeller shaft. When submerged each propeller was driven by a  electric motor. They could reach  on the surface and  underwater.

The boats were armed with six internal  torpedo tubes, four in the bow and two in the stern, for which they carried eight torpedoes. They were also armed with one  deck gun for combat on the surface. The gun was initially mounted in the rear of the conning tower, but this was re-sited on the forward deck later in the war in the surviving boats and the large conning tower was re-built to a smaller design. Their anti-aircraft armament consisted of two pairs of  machine guns. The Focas carried a total of 36 mines that they ejected through chutes in the stern.

Construction and career
Atropo was laid down by Cantieri navali Tosi di Taranto at their Taranto shipyard on 10 July 1937, launched on 20 November 1938 and completed on 14 February 1939.

References

Bibliography

External links
 Sommergibili Marina Militare website

Foca-class submarines
World War II submarines of Italy
1938 ships
Ships built by Cantieri navali Tosi di Taranto
Ships built in Taranto